Teymur Hajiyev is an Azerbaijani film director, producer, voting member of the European Film Academy and Locarno Filmmakers Academy alumnus.

Biography 
Hajiyev was born on August 28, 1982 in Baku, Azerbaijan SSR. After graduating from West Texas A&M University in 2006, and before moving into filmmaking, he worked as a marketing director within various commercial entities in Azerbaijan.

Hajiyev produced more than a dozen short films through his company FIL Production, including Torn (2014) by the Academy Award winner Elmar Imanov (premiered at the Cannes Quinzaine des Realisateurs in 2014). He premiered the first movie that he directed himself, the short The Wound, at the Palm Springs ShortsFest in 2013. His second short, Shanghai, Baku, premiered at the Tampere Film Festival in 2016, and his third, Salt, Pepper to Taste,  at the International Film Festival Rotterdam in 2019. The latter movie was included in Kinoscope’s “Top Five Shorts of 2019".

Towards Evening was the first Azeri film included in the Semaine de la Critique section of the Cannes Film Festival, featuring there in 2020. Hajiyev is the only Azerbaijani filmmaker to have participated at Cannes both as a director and a producer.

Filmography

As writer/director/producer 
Towards Evening (FIL Production/Mandarin Agency) 2020
Salt, Pepper to Taste (FIL Production) 2019
Shanghai, Baku (FIL Production/LUPA LT) 2016
The Wound (FIL Production/CineX) 2014

As producer 
Gukhuroba (SPLIT Production/FIL Production) 2020
Torn (FIL Production/Color of May) 2014

As actor 
Towards Evening (supporting role — "Man") 2020

References

External links 

 
 

1982 births
Living people
Azerbaijani screenwriters
Azerbaijani film directors
Azerbaijani film producers
West Texas A&M University alumni